HMS Duncan is the sixth and last of the Type 45 or Daring-class air-defence destroyers built for the Royal Navy and launched in 2010. Duncan is named after Adam Duncan, 1st Viscount Duncan (1 July 1731 – 4 August 1804), who defeated the Dutch fleet at the Battle of Camperdown on 11 October 1797. The destroyer has served in the Mediterranean, Black, and Caribbean Seas, and in 2019 was deployed to the Persian Gulf in response to increased tensions with Iran in the region.

Characteristics

In 2014, the Royal Navy website stated that Duncan would be the first Type 45 destroyer to be armed with the Harpoon antiship missile system. On 2 March 2015, Duncan left Portsmouth armed with Harpoon antiship missiles.

Construction
Duncans construction began at the BAE Systems Naval Ships (now part of BAE Systems Surface Ships) yards at Govan and Scotstoun on the River Clyde in 2006. She was launched from Govan on 11 October 2010, on the 213th anniversary of the Battle of Camperdown.

Duncan sailed from Scotstoun shipyard, Glasgow, on 31 August 2012 to commence sea trials.

Operational service
Duncan, the sixth and last Type 45 destroyer, was commissioned on 26 September 2013. She entered service on 30 December 2013, four months ahead of schedule, after a period of trials and training.

On 2 March 2015, Duncan left HMNB Portsmouth on her maiden deployment to the Mediterranean Sea and Middle East. On 7 July 2015, Duncan joined up with the U.S. Navy Carrier Strike Group Twelve to strike the Islamic State of Iraq and the Levant.

In April 2016, HMS Duncan was one of several Royal Navy ships exercising with the French Navy in Exercise Griffin Strike. In October 2016, Duncan, escorted by the frigate , was dispatched by the Ministry of Defence to intercept and "man-mark" a fleet of Russian Navy vessels, including their flagship , which was passing through the English Channel on its way to Syria. In November, while sailing off the coast of England, Duncan suffered a total propulsion failure and was towed back to Plymouth.

Duncan sailed from Portsmouth in June 2017 to assume the role of flagship of NATO's Standing Maritime Naval Group 2 (SNMG2), operating in the Black Sea and the Mediterranean. Duncan returned to Portsmouth on 22 September 2017.

She resumed NATO duties in January 2018, visiting Mediterranean and Black Sea ports such as Constanța, Souda Bay, and Split, and again took command of SNMG2, returning to Portsmouth on 13 July 2018. In November and December 2018, Duncan featured in the first series of the Channel 5 television documentary Warship: Life at Sea, which captured everyday life on board the vessel during her NATO deployment earlier that year, including confrontations with Russian warships and aircraft, including the Admiral Essen. On the programme,  the ship's crew frequently claimed that Duncan can detect a "tennis ball-sized object moving at three times the speed of sound, from over 100 miles away."

In December 2018, Duncan was announced to be affiliated with the town of Scarborough on the Yorkshire coast.

In July 2019, Duncan visited Odessa harbour in Ukraine. On 12 July 2019, she was ordered to the Persian Gulf in response to threats against British shipping by Iran. On arrival, she joined with the frigate  in protecting cargo vessels and oil tankers. This deployment featured in the second series of the Warship: Life at Sea television documentary.

In September 2019, Duncan returned to her home base at Portsmouth for a refit. By July 2021, Duncan’s refit was complete and she was back at sea by May 2022.

In February 2023, Duncan joined Orion23, France's largest-ever military exercise, held in the light of the Russian invasion of Ukraine. In March 2023, HMS Duncan was reported fit with Harpoon anti-ship missiles for the first time in several years.

Affiliations
 City of Dundee
 City of Belfast
 Town of Scarborough
 Scots Guards
 No1 (Fighter) Squadron RAF
 Worshipful Company of Cooks
 Worshipful Company of Saddlers
 Friends of Camperdown House
 The Mary Rose Trust
 Northern Ireland Children's Hospice
 Lachlan Goudie (Scottish painter and son of Alexander Goudie)
 City of Duncan, BC and the Royal Naval Association Vancouver Island Branch
 Glenfarclas distillery
 URNU Manchester & Salford
 HMS Hibernia
 TS Duncan Sea Cadet Unit (Dundee)
 Northern Ireland District, Sea Cadet Corps

Notes

References

External links

 Royal Navy HMS Duncan (royalnavy.mod.uk)

 

Destroyers of the United Kingdom
Type 45 destroyers
Ships built on the River Clyde
2010 ships